Diplophyllum albicans is a species of liverwort belonging to the family Scapaniaceae.

It is native to Eurasia and Northern America.

References

Jungermanniales